The Sablatnig SF-8 was a training seaplane produced in Germany during the First World War. While Sablatnig's previous designs for the Imperial German Navy had often seen service as trainers, the SF-8 was purpose-built for this role, at Dr Sablatnig's suggestion. The SF-8 was similar to the firm's earlier designs: a conventional two-bay biplane with staggered wings of unequal span, with open cockpits in tandem.

Operational history
The Navy ordered three machines for evaluation (serials 2020–2022) in 1917, which were delivered on 17 January the following year. After evaluation at Warnemünde proved favourable, the Navy ordered the type into production, placing an order for 30 machines and allocating serial numbers 6001–6030 to the batch. It is unclear how many of these were produced or delivered before the end of the war.

Specifications

Notes

References

 

 
 
 

Sablatnig aircraft
1910s German military trainer aircraft
Floatplanes
Biplanes
Single-engined tractor aircraft
Aircraft first flown in 1918